Henry Elliott (born 15 February 1946) is a French athlete. He competed in the men's high jump at the 1968 Summer Olympics and the 1972 Summer Olympics.

References

External links
 

1946 births
Living people
Athletes (track and field) at the 1968 Summer Olympics
Athletes (track and field) at the 1972 Summer Olympics
French male high jumpers
Olympic athletes of France
Sportspeople from Reims